"Love Shack" is a song by American new wave band the B-52's from their fifth studio album, Cosmic Thing (1989). It was released on June 20, 1989, and was produced by Don Was. The song was a comeback for the band following their decline in popularity in the mid-1980s and the death of guitarist Ricky Wilson in 1985.

"Love Shack" is considered the band's signature song and has been a concert staple since its release. Commercially, the single topped the charts in Australia, Ireland, and New Zealand and reached number two on the UK Singles Chart, number three on the US Billboard Hot 100 (becoming their first top-40 hit), and number five on the Canadian RPM Top Singles chart. Rolling Stone named "Love Shack" the best single of 1989 and ranked it 246th on its list of the 500 Greatest Songs of All Time. The song was also named one of the 365 Songs of the Century in 2001.

Background
The genesis of the song came from B-52's frontman Fred Schneider, and was inspired by a club outside of Athens, Georgia called the Hawaiian Ha-Le: "It was an African-American club that had a lot of good shows. It looked like a shack, you wouldn't expect it to be what it was, and when you opened the door, it was a wild band playing." Kate Pierson stated that it was "kind of like the juke joint in The Color Purple", and that the band would hang out there with a large "bohemian" group of friends. Cindy Wilson added, "It used to be this funky building with a tin roof that was old and rusty. They would have Soul Train lines."

Another inspiration for the song was thought to be a cabin near Athens with a tin roof, where the band had conceived "Rock Lobster", a single from their 1979 debut album. The five-room cabin, which was located on a dairy farm, had once been rented by Pierson and her then-husband, after they had relocated to Athens in the 1970s. Author Mats Sexton recalled that Pierson had stated several of the band's early songs were conceived in the cabin through jamming, including "many different guitar riffs and assorted lyrics". The cabin, which was on the cusp of being reoccupied and renovated, burned down in December 2004.

Composition and recording
The song was the last to be recorded for the Cosmic Thing album and was devised when the band's sessions with producer Don Was finished a day early. The band had a 15-minute long piece that was undeveloped and presented it to Was, who suggested integrating another piece they'd been improvising about a "love shack" as the song's chorus. Pierson later recalled, "It wasn't even gonna make the album because it wasn't solidified. But after we added that chorus, Bingo, here it is; it sounds like a hit. But we didn't aim to write hits, we aimed to heal ourselves and channel Ricky [Wilson]'s spirit. That was the goal, and I knew his presence was there." The section that begins "the love shack is a little old place where..." was initially only in the song once, but both Pierson and Was felt it should repeat, although Schneider disagreed.

Wilson's line "tin roof rusted" originated from a jam session for the song, where the band were rehearsing along with pre-recorded instrumentation. Wilson was yelling the line as the backing tape stopped, which the band found amusing and thought provided a suitable ending. Wilson later elaborated, "It was just a vision in my head of my love shack." While there has been speculation about the meaning of the line, Pierson has also corroborated that the line is literally referencing a rusted tin roof. Wilson mused, "It's amazing what people have come up with in the past about it. I kind of like that. Let the people participate in the meaning. I'm fine with that."

According to Was, Wilson's performance of the "tin roof rusted" line in the song's first proper recording session had an "exuberance that shocked everybody ... she infused it with so much feeling, it threw everybody." After further attempts to re-record it failed to recreate the same "manic energy", Was decided he would keep the take and punch in the remainder of the song.

During the recording of one take, a lightning storm caused the power to go out in the studio during the breakdown section, which put the session temporarily on hold. When the band reconvened, they realized the incomplete take was so good that they would keep it and splice it together with another take.

Reception

Commercial
"Love Shack" became the band's biggest hit song as well as their first million-copy seller. It was the band's first song to reach the top 40 on the US Billboard Hot 100, peaking at number three in November 1989. It also reached number five in Canada, number two in the United Kingdom, and number one in Australia (eight weeks), Ireland (one week) and New Zealand (four weeks), as well as on the Billboard Modern Rock Tracks chart (four weeks).

Critical
Caren Myers from Melody Maker said, "This wins hands down on packaging of the week, as it comes in a fold-out, pop-up love shack that you can brighten your mantelpiece with. The shack is the sort of place that shimmies when people start grooving there. The B-52's are still pretty much making the same frivolous music they always have, but I'd take their joyful silliness over a whole warehouse full of self-conscious iconoplasts any day. Next Thursday would be fine." David Giles from Music Week wrote, "The B-52's deserve a hit after their fine return to form last summer with the Cosmic Thing LP, but I'd be surprised if this is the track to do it." He added, "Like "Party Out of Bounds", it tries to conjure up a wild, chaotic celebration, but unlike that particular track it is neither inventive nor melodic enough." Pan-European magazine Music & Media named it "the best track from the disappointing Cosmic Thing. Good clean fun from some of the US' most productive eccentrics." Ian McCann  from NME felt it's a rip-off of "Going to a Go-Go". People magazine noted the "wild abandon" of the song.

In retrospective reviews, Stephen Thomas Erlewine of AllMusic described it as "an irresistible dance number with delightfully silly lyrics and hooks as big as a whale that unbelievably gave the group a long-awaited Top Ten hit." Matthew Hocter from Albumism cited "Love Shack" as an example of the band's "own unique brand of upbeat, lyrically positive and infectious dance grooves". The Daily Vault's Denise Henderson commented, "The celebration of life in dance and music is demonstrated by the repetitive chorus 'Everybody's movin/everybody's groovin baby!' Well, when in doubt, dancing and drinking and having a little fun always worked for me!"

Music video
The accompanying music video for "Love Shack" was directed by American film, music video and television director Adam Bernstein and shot at the home and studio of ceramic artists Philip Maberry and Scott Walker in Highland, New York. Bernstein initially wanted to shoot the video in a New York studio but was convinced to relocate once he saw the house. 

The video features a cameo from a pre-fame RuPaul in his first mainstream appearance. Pierson later recalled, "we invited all our friends and had a party. ... We started out really early in the morning and it turned into this rave. RuPaul got the dance line going, and it almost felt like we weren't being videotaped." Guitarist Keith Strickland stated that the dance line scene was an homage to the television show Soul Train, and that RuPaul stepped in to direct the scene when Bernstein "didn't get the process". Video artist Tom Rubnitz also appears in the video as the bartender. The video won the award for Best Group Video at the 1990 MTV Video Music Awards.

Track listings
The single release contained different tracks in different countries of release. Some countries, including the United States, had singles backed with "Channel Z", while other releases included live versions of "Planet Claire" and "Rock Lobster" as the B-side. In 1999, the single was released again with a number of remixes, including one by DJ Tonka. Although the re-release did not chart in the United States, it did enter the UK Singles Chart.

 US 12-inch maxi-single
A1. "Love Shack" (12-inch remix) – 7:58
A2. "Love Shack" (12-inch instrumental) – 6:34
B1. "Love Shack" (12-inch mix) – 6:09
B2. "Love Shack" (Big Radio mix) – 5:32
B3. "Channel Z" (12-inch rock mix) – 6:22

 US maxi-CD single
 "Love Shack" (12-inch remix) – 7:58
 "Love Shack" (remix/edit) – 4:02
 "Channel Z" (12-inch rock mix) – 6:22
 "Love Shack" (12-inch mix) – 6:09
 "Love Shack" (a cappella) – 3:54
 "Love Shack" (Big Radio mix) – 5:32

 International 7-inch single
A. "Love Shack" (edit) – 4:15
B. "Channel Z" (LP version) – 4:49

 Australian 12-inch single
A1. "Love Shack" (12-inch remix) – 7:58
A2. "Love Shack" (12-inch instrumental) – 6:34
A3. "Rock Lobster" (original version) – 6:49
B1. "Love Shack" (12-inch mix) – 6:09
B2. "Love Shack" (Big Radio mix) – 5:32
B3. "Channel Z" (12-inch rock mix) – 6:22

 Australian CD single
 "Love Shack" – 4:18
 "Planet Claire" (live) – 5:10
 "Rock Lobster" (live) – 5:17

 "Love Shack 99"
 "Love Shack 99" (radio mix) – 4:39
 "Love Shack" (DJ Tonka remix) – 6:28
 "Love Shack" (album version) – 5:21

Charts

Weekly charts

"Love Shack 99"

Year-end charts

Certifications

In popular culture
 "Love Shack" was played in the third-season finale of Full House, where Stephanie danced to the song at the "We Love Our Children" telethon. The scene was also recreated by Jimmy Gibbler in the final season of Fuller House.
In the Step by Step episode "The Kissing Game," the song can be heard on the radio in the background during the party that JT is throwing at Carol's salon.
The science education show Bill Nye the Science Guy featured a parody of the song entitled "Bloodstream", about the human circulatory system, as a "Soundtrack of Science" segment in the episode "Blood & Circulation".
 The song was covered in Glee's third-season episode "Heart." The episode, broadcast on Valentines Day, used the song to close the show. The cover, primarily performed by Darren Criss and Chris Colfer, was cited as the highlight of the episode by several critics, and a "rousing" end to the episode.
 The song was lip synced in 2016 on the television show Lip Sync Battle by American basketball player Shaquille O'Neal. Because O'Neal commonly goes by the nickname Shaq, host LL Cool J pointed out that O'Neal was singing a "love song to himself."
This song was featured at the start of the 21 Jump Street Season 4 episode "Say It Ain't So, Pete" where Hanson and Penhall go undercover at a bar off-campus.
The B-52's were guest judges on the ninth season of the drag reality television show RuPaul's Drag Race, where this song was performed in a "Lip Sync For Your Life" by drag queens Jaymes Mansfield and Kimora Blac.
 The B-52's guest-starred in the episode "E-I-E-I-(Annoyed Grunt)" of The Simpsons. In it they sang a parody of the song, titled "Glove Slap".
 "Love Shack" was the developmental code name given by Apple Computer for their first Mac OS-compatible portable computer - the "Mac Portable."
 "Take me to your love shack, Mama's always got to backtrack," from the song "Everybody Talks" (2011) by Neon Trees, briefly references the song.

See also
 List of Billboard number-one alternative singles of the 1980s
 List of number-one singles in Australia during the 1980s
 List of number-one singles of 1990 (Ireland)
 List of number-one singles from the 1990s (New Zealand)

References

1989 singles
1989 songs
1999 singles
The B-52's songs
Irish Singles Chart number-one singles
Number-one singles in Australia
Number-one singles in New Zealand
Reprise Records singles
Song recordings produced by Don Was
Songs about Georgia (U.S. state)
Songs written by Cindy Wilson
Songs written by Fred Schneider
Songs written by Kate Pierson
Songs written by Keith Strickland